Ger O'Meara is an inter-county hurler and Gaelic footballer for O'Tooles and Dublin.

Career

O'Tooles
He plays his club hurling for O'Tooles and plays anywhere across the back line or midfield. He won a Dublin Senior Hurling Championship in 2002 and a Dublin Senior Hurling League in 2006.

He received a Dublin Hurling Blue Star award for his performances for O'Tooles in 2004.

Dublin
O'Meara had previously opted out of the Dublin Senior Hurling squad due to a call up to the senior football panel by manager Paul Caffrey, although he made his return to play for Dublin's hurling team for the All-Ireland Group B clash against Offaly in 2006. O'Meara played a valuable part in Dublin's hurling relegation clash with Westmeath which retained Dublin's Liam MacCarthy Cup status for 2007. O'Meara played in the 2006 Leinster Under-21 Hurling Championship final for Dublin, finishing on the losing team against Kilkenny in Nowlan Park.

Honours

O'Tooles
Dublin Senior Hurling Championship (1): 2002

Dublin Senior Hurling League (1): 2006  

Dublin Under 21 Hurling Championship: 2004

Dublin Under 21 Division 1 Hurling League (1):

Dublin Under-21 Division 1 Football League (1):

CountyLeinster Minor Football Championship (1): 2003 (c)

IndividualDublin Blue Stars (1):''' 2004

References

1985 births
Living people
Dual players
Dublin inter-county Gaelic footballers
Dublin inter-county hurlers
O'Tooles Gaelic footballers
O'Tooles hurlers